Jess Thorup (born 21 February 1970) is a Danish professional football manager and former player, who most recently managed Danish Superliga club FC Copenhagen.

Playing career
Thorup progressed through the youth academy of Odense Boldklub (OB). He made his professional debut for the club in 1989 and won the Danish league title the same year. In both 1991 and 1993, Thorup was also part of the team winning the Danish Cup. In 1996, he moved to Germany and joined KFC Uerdingen 05, who competed in the 2. Bundesliga. After just three goals in 39 league games, he moved to Austrian football halfway through the 1997–98 season, where he joined FC Tirol Innsbruck. He returned to Denmark in the summer of 1998, and played for Esbjerg fB until 2005. He then signed with HamKam in Norway, before returning to Esbjerg where he retired in 2006.

Managerial career

Esbjerg
In 2006, Thorup returned to Esbjerg fB as assistant coach to Troels Bech. After the dismissal of his boss in November 2008, he took over the team as caretaker manager for three games, but then returned to the role of assistant to new head coach Ove Pedersen. After his resignation on 14 March 2011, he was promoted to head coach, but could not prevent relegation from the Danish Superliga. After achieving direct promotion the following year, the team placed themselves in middle regions of the league table and won the Danish Cup in 2012–13, beating Randers. Thorup was then voted Danish Football Manager of the Year for 2013.

Denmark U21
On 21 February 2013 it was announced that starting 1 June 2013 he would become the manager of the Denmark under-21 national football team, thereby leaving Esbjerg fB. As the coach of the under-21 team, he took part in the 2015 UEFA European Under-21 Championship, in which the Danish team reached the semi-finals. There, they lost to eventual winners Sweden.

Midtjylland
After the European Championship, Thorup returned to club football and took over Midtjylland as the successor to Glen Riddersholm, who had resigned after winning the league title – Midtjylland's first. After they were eliminated from qualifying for the UEFA Champions League by Cypriot club APOEL, the team survived the group stage of the 2015–16 UEFA Europa League under Thorup's leadership. In the round of 16, the club caught the eye with a 2–1 first leg win over Premier League giants Manchester United, but were eliminated from the competition after a 5–1 defeat in the second leg.

Gent and Genk
On 10 October 2018, Thorup was hired as a coach by the Belgian club Gent. Gent finished the 2018–19 season in fifth place in the championship play-offs. In July 2019, Mechelen was punished for manipulating the game of the Belgian First Division A against Waasland-Beveren on 11 March 2018 in the 2017–18 season, including expulsion from the Europa League. All Belgian clubs moved up to a qualifying place. The last place that became vacant was taken over by the Gent as the first non-qualified club, so that Gent was qualified for the UEFA Europa League and played their first game in the second qualifying round against Romanian Viitorul Constanța. Through the other qualifying rounds, the club finally reached the group stage, where they won Group I with three wins and three draws. Gent took part in the round of 32, where they were eliminated by Roma. In the 2019–20 season, Gent was second behind Club Brugge when the league was cancelled after the 29th matchday of the main round due to the COVID-19 pandemic. As the abandonment table for the European spots was used, Gent qualified for the third qualifying round for the 2020–21 UEFA Champions League.

After the club had lost the first two games in the 2020–21 season, Thorup was dismissed as coach on 20 August 2020. On 24 September, he was hired by league rivals Genk as the new coach. He received a contract there until the summer of 2023.

Copenhagen
In early November 2020, Thorup received an offer from FC Copenhagen to become their new head coach after their former manager Ståle Solbakken had been dismissed on 10 October. At Thorup's request, his contract was terminated by Genk. Thorup signed a contract in Copenhagen until the summer of 2024.

In his first season as manager of Copenhagen he guided the club to a 3rd place finish in the Danish Superliga. This meant that the club participated in the inaugural season of the UEFA Conference League, and Thorup led his team to the Round of 16, in which they were defeated by PSV Eindhoven.

His second season in charge of F.C. Copenhagen ended with the club being crowned as Danish champions after winning the 2021–22 Danish Superliga.

The 2022–23 Danish Superliga started poorly for the club, but they managed to qualify for the 2022–23 UEFA Champions League after defeating Trabzonspor 2–1 on aggregate. Howerver, on 20 September 2022, F.C. Copenhagen announced that the club had parted ways with Thorup as their head coach due to the poor start to the Superliga season.

Managerial statistics

Honours

Player

OB
 1st Division: 1989
 Danish Cup: 1990–91, 1992–93

Manager

Esbjerg fB
 Danish 1st Division: 2011–12
 Danish Cup: 2012–13

Midtjylland
 Danish Superliga: 2017–18

Copenhagen
 Danish Superliga: 2021–22
 The Atlantic Cup: Runner-up'' (2): 2020, 2022

References

External links
EfB profile 

1970 births
Living people
People from Esbjerg
Danish men's footballers
Danish expatriate men's footballers
Association football forwards
Danish Superliga players
2. Bundesliga players
Austrian Football Bundesliga players
Eliteserien players
Odense Boldklub players
KFC Uerdingen 05 players
Esbjerg fB players
Hamarkameratene players
Expatriate footballers in Germany
Expatriate footballers in Austria
Expatriate footballers in Norway
Danish expatriate sportspeople in Germany
Danish expatriate sportspeople in Austria
Danish expatriate sportspeople in Norway
Danish football managers
Danish expatriate football managers
Danish Superliga managers
Belgian Pro League managers
Esbjerg fB managers
FC Midtjylland managers
K.A.A. Gent managers
K.R.C. Genk managers
F.C. Copenhagen managers
Expatriate football managers in Belgium
Sportspeople from the Region of Southern Denmark